Ceraarachne is a genus of South American crab spiders that was first described by Eugen von Keyserling in 1880.

Species
 it contains four species, found in Colombia and Brazil:
Ceraarachne blanci (Mello-Leitão, 1917) – Brazil
Ceraarachne germaini Simon, 1886 – Brazil
Ceraarachne goyannensis Mello-Leitão, 1929 – Brazil
Ceraarachne varia Keyserling, 1880 (type) – Colombia

See also
 List of Thomisidae species

References

Further reading

Araneomorphae genera
Spiders of South America
Taxa named by Eugen von Keyserling
Thomisidae